America's Black Forum is a nationally syndicated weekly news broadcast targeted to an African American audience. The show started in 1977, and is one of the longest running U.S. syndicated television series.

As of 2021, the new series is hosted by Marc Morial of the National Urban League. The original show has been presented by James Brown and Juan Williams, and featured such commentators as Armstrong Williams, Deborah Mathis and Charles Ogletree.

Central City Productions, Inc. currently owns the rights to America's Black Forum. America's Black Forum was owned by Byron Lewis Sr, Chair, founder of UniWorld Group in the 1970s. Lewis' son, Byron Lewis Jr., was the Executive Producer.  'Sweet Auburn' was one of the films ABF produced. In 2005, America’s Black Forum was sold to New Millennium, a joint venture between Central City Productions, Inc. and Graves Ventures, owner of Black Enterprise. In 2016 Central City Productions took over the ownership of America’s Black Forum.

In 2021, Central City Productions is reviving the series as a half-hour program with the same format, slated to premiere in October 2021 with Marc Morial serving as the host for the revival series.

As of 2021, the show will air in National Broadcast Syndication. The show was previously broadcast on TV One.

Lavonia Perryman Fairfax was an executive producer of the original America Black Forum in the 1980s.  She produced the Emmy Award Jesse Jackson Presidential Campaign special.

References

TV One (American TV channel) original programming
English-language television shows
1977 American television series debuts
1970s American television news shows
1980s American television news shows
1990s American television news shows
2000s American television news shows
2010s American television news shows
2020s American television news shows
African-American news and public affairs television series